is a Japanese former motorcycle racer.

Career
He won the 2017 Red Bull MotoGP Rookies Cup and made his Moto3 World Championship debut as a wildcard during 2017 Valencia GP, where he finished 10th.

He joined Moto3 as a full-time rider in  switching from Honda's Asia Talent Team to KTM's RBA BOE.

After two unsuccessful seasons in Moto3, he stepped down to FIM CEV Moto3 Junior World Championship in 2020.

Career statistics

FIM CEV Moto3 Junior World Championship

Races by year
(key) (Races in bold indicate pole position, races in italics indicate fastest lap)

Red Bull MotoGP Rookies Cup

Races by year
(key) (Races in bold indicate pole position, races in italics indicate fastest lap)

Grand Prix motorcycle racing

By season

Races by year
(key) (Races in bold indicate pole position, races in italics indicate fastest lap)

References

External links

 

2000 births
Living people
Japanese motorcycle racers
Moto3 World Championship riders
People from Fukuoka